Timipere Johnson Eboh (born 19 June 2002) is a Nigerian professional footballer who plays as a midfielder for Greek Super League 2 club Panathinaikos B, on loan from Asteras Tripolis.

References

2002 births
Living people
Nigerian footballers
Super League Greece players
Super League Greece 2 players
Asteras Tripolis F.C. players
Episkopi F.C. players
Association football midfielders
Panathinaikos F.C. B players
Expatriate footballers in Greece
Nigerian expatriate footballers
Nigerian expatriate sportspeople in Greece